The 2017–18 season was Blackburn Rovers' 130th season as a professional football club and its first playing in the League One following its relegation from the Championship the previous season. Along with competing in the League One, the club also participated in the FA Cup, EFL Cup and EFL Trophy. Thanks to a 0–1 win against Doncaster Rovers on 24 April, Blackburn were promoted to the Championship. The season covers the period from 1 July 2017 to 30 June 2018.

Summer Activity

May

On 8 May Rovers announced Paul Senior has resigned from his role as Director of Football & Operations.

On 16 May Rovers owners Venky's have brought in accountancy firms Deloitte and KPMG to carry out an overview of the club.

On 18 May Rovers announced their retained list: Adam Henley, Gordon Greer, Jason Lowe, Hope Akpan, Danny Guthrie, Wes Brown, Ramirez Howarth and Joshua Askew have not been offered further terms. The following academy scholars will not be retained: Ben Ascroft, Alex Curran, Mason Fawns, Callum Hendry, Matthew Makinson, Tre Pemberton, Joel Steer and Ben Williams with non-contracted player Joshua Powell also released.

The club also announced that new contract offers had been made to Connor Mahoney and Lewis Travis. Whilst professional contract offers have been made to youngsters Charley Doyle, Joe Grayson, Tyler Magloire and Stefan Mols.

June

On 2 June Rovers announced Mark Venus had joined as the club's Assistant Manager.

On 8 June Rovers confirmed Tony Mowbray's backroom staff after the appointment of Mark Venus, David Lowe will take up the role as first team coach, David Dunn will revert to his role as assistant coach of the under 23s & Ben Benson will remain as goalkeeping coach.

On 9 June Rovers announced Tony Mowbray has committed his long-term future to the club signing a new 2-year contract with the option of a further 12 months.

On 13 June Rovers announced the signing of midfielder Peter Whittingham on a free from Cardiff City. The 32-year-old, became manager Tony Mowbray's first signing, putting pen-to-paper on a two-year deal at Ewood Park, which runs through to the summer of 2019.

On 14 June Rovers announced promising young defender Lewis Travis has signed a new 1-year deal.

On 16 June Rovers were drawn against Coventry City at the Ricoh Arena in First Round of the EFL Cup, Tony Mowbray old club.

On 17 June Rovers announced three of Rovers rising stars midfielders Joe Grayson and Stefan Mols and defender Charley Doyle had all signed their first professional contracts, signing two-year deals.

On 20 June Rovers announced the signing of midfielder Richie Smallwood on a free from Rotherham United, putting pen-to-paper on a two-year deal with the option of a further year.

On 26 June Rovers announced that another rising star, defender Tyler Magloire, has signed his first professional contract, signing a two-year deal.

On 26 June Rovers announced that first team coach David Lowe has pledged his commitment to the club by putting pen-to-paper on a new long-term contract.

On 27 June Rovers announced the signing of attacking midfielder Bradley Dack from Gillingham  for a reported £750,000 plus add-ons, on a 3-year deal.

On 28 June Rovers announced the signing of midfielder Ben Gladwin from Queens Park Rangers  for an undisclosed fee, on a 2-year deal.

On 29 June Rovers commenced pre-season training.

July

On 4 July Bournemouth announced the signing of midfielder Connor Mahoney on a 4-year deal after rejecting a new contract at Rovers, compensation to be agreed.

On 11 July Rovers announced that Eric Kinder has left his position as the club's Head of Academy.

On 18 July Rovers announced rising stars will continue to compete at the highest level of youth football after the club confirmed it will remain a Category One Academy.

On 18 July Burton Albion announced the signing of midfielder Hope Akpan on a 1-year deal following his release from Rovers.

On 19 July Rovers announced the signing of striker Dominic Samuel from Reading  for an undisclosed fee, on a 3-year deal.

On 20 July Rovers announced the signing of defender Paul Caddis following a successful trial at the club on a 2-year deal, he was a free agent following his release from Bury.

On 21 July Rovers announced the departure of striker Anthony Stokes by mutual consent.

On 21 July Rovers announced that defender Ryan Nyambe had signed a new long term contract, signing a 3-year deal, with the option of a further 12 months.

On 22 July Rovers announced the signing of striker Joe Nuttall following a successful trial scoring 5 goals in 2 games for the u23s, on a 12-month deal with option of a further 12 months, he was a free agent following his release from Aberdeen.

On 24 July Rovers announced the appointment of Stuart Jones as Head of Academy, he joined as the Academy as Head of Education in 2011, before moving up to the role of Head of Academy Operations four years later.

On 26 July Rovers announced Jason Steele has joined Sunderland for an undisclosed fee.

On 31 July Kilmarnock announced the signing of defender Gordon Greer following his release from Rovers.

On 31 July Rovers announced Goalkeeping Coach Ben Benson has signed a new long term deal at the club.

August

On 2 August Rovers announced the signing of Canadian International Goalkeeper Jayson Leutwiler from Shrewsbury Town on a 2-year deal for an undisclosed fee.

On 2 August Hibernian announced the signing of striker Anthony Stokes on a 2-year deal following his release from Rovers.

On 4 August Rovers announced the signing of midfielder Harry Chapman on loan for the season from Middlesbrough.

On 11 August Rovers announced the signing of forward Marcus Antonsson on loan for the season from Leeds United.

On 14 August Rovers announced the appointment of Tony Carss as the academy's Head of Coaching.

On 15 August Kerala Blasters announced the signing of Wes Brown for the upcoming Indian Super League season, following his release from Rovers.

On 31 August Birmingham City announced the signing of Jason Lowe on a 12-month contract following his release from Rovers.

On 31 August Rovers announced the signings of midfielder Rekeem Harper on loan for the season from West Brom, defender Sam Hart from Liverpool on a 2-year deal for an Undisclosed fee  and defender Paul Downing on loan for a season from Milton Keynes Dons. It was also announced that midfielder Liam Feeney has gone out on loan to Cardiff City until 1 January 2018.

September

On 11 September Rovers announced that defender Scott Wharton had signed a new 3-year contract.

October

On 5 October Rovers announced that striker Daniel Butterworth had signed his 1st professional contract, a 2-year deal.

On 5 October Rovers announced that midfielder Elliott Bennett had signed a new 2-year contract.

November

On 3 November Rovers announced that midfielder Willem Tomlinson had signed a new & extended contract until 2019.

On 13 November Rovers announced that goalkeeper Andy Fisher had signed a new & extended contract until 2019.

On 28 November Rovers announced that midfielder Lewis Hardcastle had signed a new & extended contract until 2019.

December

On 18 December Rovers announced that defender Matthew Platt had signed a new & extended contract until 2019.

On 18 December Rovers announced the appointment of Steve Waggott as the club's new chief executive.

Winter Activity

January

On 2 January Rovers announced West Brom have recalled Rekeem Harper from his loan spell.

On 5 January Rovers announced that midfielder Liam Feeney will remain on loan at Cardiff City until the end of the season.

On 8 January Rovers announced that defender Paul Downing has signed permanently from Milton Keynes Dons following his loan spell for an undisclosed fee.

On 9 January Rovers announced that striker Adam Armstrong has joined on loan for the remainder of the season from Newcastle United.

On 16 January Rovers announced that attacking midfielder Jack Payne has joined on loan for the remainder of the season from Huddersfield Town.

On 17 January Rovers announced that defender Sam Hart has joined Rochdale on loan for the remainder of the season.

On 18 January Rovers announced that striker Joe Nuttall has signed a new 3 a half year deal, until 2021.

On 19 January Rovers announced the signing of defender Amari'i Bell from Fleetwood Town for an undisclosed fee on a 2 and half year contract.

On 26 January Rovers announced that midfielder John Buckley had signed his 1st professional contract, until 2020.

On 30 January Rovers announced that defender Elliott Ward has joined Milton Keynes Dons on loan for the remainder of the season.

On 31 January Rovers announced that the club has agreed to terminate the contract of young midfielder Connor Thomson by mutual consent, young center-back Scott Wharton has joined Lincoln City on loan until the end of the season, academy midfielder Callum Wright has joined Leicester City for an undisclosed fee.

February

On 1 February Rovers announced that goalkeeper David Raya has signed a new 3 a half year deal, until 2021.

On 2 February Rovers announced that young versatile midfielder Lewis Travis has signed a new 3 a half year deal, until 2021.

On 7 February Rovers announced that midfielder Jack Evans had signed his 1st professional contract, until 2020.

On 14 February Rovers announced the signing of highly rated young forward Okera Simmonds from Liverpool on a 1 and half year contract & will link up with the u23s squad.

On 16 February Rovers announced that defender Hayden Carter had signed his 1st professional contract, until 2020.

On 14 February Rovers announced the signing of goalkeeper Oliver Byrne who was recently with Cardiff City on a 1 and half year contract & will link up with the u23s squad.

On 22 February Rovers announced that defender Jack Doyle has joined Derry City on loan for the remainder of the season.

March

On 3 March Rovers announced that young Canadian midfielder Ben Paton had signed his 1st professional contract, until 2019.

On 16 March Rovers announced that young attacking midfielder Jack Vale had signed his 1st professional contract, until 2020.

On 20 March Rovers announced that young defender Lewis Thompson had signed his 1st professional contract, until 2019.

April

On 3 April Rovers trio David Raya, Charlie Mulgrew & Bradley Dack have all been included in the EFL League One Team of the Year.

On 15 April Rovers star Bradley Dack has been named as the League One Player of the Year.

On 18 April Rovers players Bradley Dack, Charlie Mulgrew, Danny Graham & Amari'i Bell were announced in the PFA League One Team of the Year.

On 20 April Rovers U23 were crowned champions of the Premier League 2 Division 2.

On 24 April Rovers won promotion back to the Championship, following a 1–0 at Doncaster Rovers.

May

On 5 May Rovers announced Bradley Dack as the Player of the Season, he also won Goal of the Season with his goal against Peterborough.

On 7 May Rovers held their end of season awards the winners follow:

Young Player – David Raya,
Players’ Player – Charlie Mulgrew,
Best Newcomer – Richie Smallwood,
Unsung Hero – Elliott Bennett,
Man of the Match (Seasonal) – Bradley Dack,
Goal of the Season – Bradley Dack,
Player of the Year – Bradley Dack,
Special Achievement – Tony Mowbray.

Squad information

Pre-Season Friendlies
As of 17 June 2017, Blackburn Rovers have announced six pre-season friendlies against Barrow, Morecambe, Grimsby Town, York City, Carlisle United and Sparta Prague.

League One

League table

Result by round

Matchday

EFL Cup
The first round draw of the EFL Cup took place on 16 June 2017 and Blackburn Rovers were drawn away to Coventry City. A home tie against Burnley was confirmed for the second round.

FA Cup
In the FA Cup, Blackburn Rovers would face Barnet at home in the first round and Crewe Alexandra at home in the second round.

EFL Trophy

The first round fixtures of the EFL Trophy (named Checkatrade Trophy for sponsorship reasons) are scheduled for week commencing Monday 28 August.

Blackburn entered the competition at the first round group stage and were drawn against Bury, Rochdale and Stoke City u23s in Northern Group C.

2017–18 EFL Trophy Group C Northern Section

Group C

Backroom staff

1st Team squad statistics

Appearances and goals

|-
|colspan="14"|Players out on loan:   

|-
|colspan="14"|Players that played for Blackburn Rovers this season that have left the club: 

|}

Goalscorers

Disciplinary record

Transfers

Summer

Transfers in 

Total outgoing: +/- ~£1,250,000 (undisclosed fee)

Transfers out 

Total incoming: +/- ~£ £425,000 + further Undisclosed fee's ( * Connor Mahoney transfer fee £425,000 as determined by tribunal including additional add on fee's – ** Jason Steele transfer Undisclosed, however estimated to be around £560,000 with add ons.)

Loans in

Loans out

Winter

Transfers In

Transfers Out

Loans In

Loans Out

References

Blackburn Rovers
Blackburn Rovers F.C. seasons